Swinger Bay, is a bay on the north west shore of Milne Bay, in Milne Bay Province,Papua New Guinea. Named by John Moresby after HMS Swinger. It is also known as Stringer Bay.

Swinger Bay, and the city on the bay Alotau, was selected as a site for an amphibious training centre in 1943 during World War II, which relocated from HMAS Assault, Port Stephens, Australia. The detachment built facilities, on a site noted as being high and relatively dry, for about 800 men and 30 officers that included storage, shops, housing, roads, water and electrical systems and a  jetty to water of  depth. The 91st was relieved by 105th Naval Construction Battalion in January 1944.

The amphibious training centre consisted of housing for 1,500 men in quonset huts and developed  of waterfront for training purposes.

Rabi Camp (also spelled Rabe), part of HMAS Ladava, was attacked by Japan in 1942 in the Battle of Milne Bay.

The Gama River flows into Swinger Bay.

In March 1945, the amphibious training centre closed and relocated to Subic Bay, Philippines.

Footnotes

Citations

References

Bays of Papua New Guinea
Geography of Milne Bay Province